Bhinda Jatt, is a Punjabi bhangra singer-songwriter.

Discography

Duo Collaboration

References

https://web.archive.org/web/20040324155456/http://bhindajatt.com/
http://www.ecrater.co.uk/search.php?keywords=Bhinda+jatt&x=0&y=0
http://www.kissrecords.com/album.asp?id=10

1978 births
Bhangra (music) musicians
Living people
American male singer-songwriters
American people of Punjabi descent
Singer-songwriters from California
21st-century American singers
21st-century American male singers